The Infrastructure University Kuala Lumpur (IUKL; Malay: Universiti Infrastruktur Kuala Lumpur), formerly known as Kuala Lumpur Infrastructure University College (KLIUC), is a university in Kajang, Hulu Langat District, Selangor, Malaysia. It is the first infrastructure university in Malaysia. It was established in 1998 following the privatisation of the Research and Training Institute of Public Works Department of Malaysia (IKRAM).

The university is a subsidiary of Protasco Berhad, a company listed on the Main Board of Bursa Malaysia. The president and vice-chancellor of IUKL is Prof. Dato' Dr. Noor Inayah Ya'akub.

History

The initiation of IUKL began in 1997 when the Research and Training Institute of the Public Works Department, Malaysia (IKRAM) was privatised and became known as Kumpulan Ikram Sdn Bhd (KISB). KISB inherited Ikram Park and IKRAM's distinctive features and strengths.

Ikram College was established the following year and made the focus of KISB's tertiary education activities to nurture the leaders of tomorrow. The opening of Ikram College was officiated by Malaysian Prime Minister Tun Dr. Mahathir Mohamad in 1999.

By 2001, Ikram College had its name changed to Ikram College of Technology (iCT) to further strengthen its niche in the provision of technology and infrastructure based programmes. iCT was upgraded to a University College status with a new name: Kuala Lumpur Infrastructure University College (KLIUC) in 2003 with the Malaysian Prime Minister, Tun Abdullah Ahmad Badawi, officiated its opening.

In February 2012, IKRAM Education Sdn. Bhd. was invited by the Malaysian Ministry of Higher Education to apply for the establishment of a private university to be known as the Infrastructure University of Kuala Lumpur. KLIUC was upgraded to a full-fledged university in 2013 and officially known as the Infrastructure University Kuala Lumpur (IUKL) today.

Campus

IUKL's  campus is nestled in the vicinity of Kajang and Serdang, which is between the capital Kuala Lumpur and Putrajaya, the administrative city of Malaysia. It is within a 35-minute drive from Kuala Lumpur city centre, 40 minutes from the Kuala Lumpur International Airport (KLIA) and 20 minutes from Cyberjaya, the country's intelligent city.

The campus is accessible via the North–South Highway (or Seremban Highway). Students can also make their way to IUKL via KTM Komuter intercity train service to Serdang Station and LRT to Sungai Besi Station, then get on to IUKL feeder bus service.

Faculties
 Faculty of Engineering and Technology Infrastructure
 Faculty of Business and Accountancy
 Faculty of Creative Media and Innovative Technology
 Faculty of Arts, Communication and Education
 Faculty of Applied Science and Foundation Studies
 Faculty of Architecture and Built Environment

Living and accommodation
Student accommodation is available on and off campus including hostel blocks, Students Residency at Unipark condominiums, and Soho units at De Centrum.

References

External links
 MEC Malaysian Education Centre, Pakistan
 Official site
 Kumpulan Ikram Sdn Bhd (KISB)
 Protasco Bhd

Universities and colleges in Selangor
Kajang
Educational institutions established in 1998
1998 establishments in Malaysia
Private universities and colleges in Malaysia